Gonzalo Manuel García (born February 18, 1984) is an Argentine-born Italian rugby union player for Zebre in the Pro14 competition. Gonzalo García's position is centre.

Biography
García was born in Mendoza, Argentina and made his debut for that city's side Maristas, winning the provincial title in 2006.
He played the U-19 World Cup in France in 2003 and the U-21 World Cup in Argentina in 2005 for Argentina.

In 2007 he moved to Italy to play with Rugby Calvisano, subsequently choosing the Italian nationality. After winning an Italian title at Calvisano in 2008, he moved to Benetton Treviso in the Pro12.

García debuted for the Italian national team against South Africa in Cape Town on 21 June 2008, in a 26-0 loss. He scored his first test match try against South Africa on 21 November 2009 in the Stadio Friuli, Udine. He was called for the 2011 Rugby World Cup, playing in three games but without scoring.

External links
Profile on scrum.com

1984 births
Living people
Sportspeople from Mendoza, Argentina
Argentine rugby union players
Italian rugby union players
Rugby union centres
Argentine sportspeople of Italian descent
Italy international rugby union players
Argentine emigrants to Italy
Rugby Calvisano players
Benetton Rugby players
Zebre Parma players
Argentina international rugby sevens players